Helenieae is a tribe of the plant family Asteraceae. The type genus is Helenium, but the best known members of the tribe are the Gaillardia. Helenieae are usually placed in their own tribe, but some authors include this and several other tribes as subtribes within a broader definition of the tribe Heliantheae.

Subtribes and genera
Helenieae subtribes and genera recognized by the Global Compositae Database:

Subtribe Gaillardiinae 
Balduina 
Gaillardia 
Helenium 

Subtribe Marshalliinae 
Marshallia 

Subtribe Plateileminae 
Plateilema 

Subtribe Psathyrotinae 
Pelucha 
Psathyrotes 
Trichoptilium 

Subtribe Tetraneurinae 
Amblyolepis 
Baileya 
Hymenoxys 
Psilostrophe 
Tetraneuris

References

 
Asteraceae tribes